Dundalk enter the 2023 season having finished in third place in the league the previous season. They were still the League of Ireland Cup holders because, after they had won it in 2019, the competition was not held between 2020 and 2022. 2023 is Dundalk's 15th consecutive season in the top tier of Irish football, their 88th in all, and their 97th in the League of Ireland. They will enter the 2023–24 UEFA Europa Conference League at the first qualifying round stage. It will be Dundalk's 26th European campaign.

Stephen O'Donnell is the club's head coach going into the new term, his second season in charge.

Season summary

First-Team Squad (2023)
Sources:
Note: Substitute appearances in brackets

Competitions

Premier Division

League table

FAI Cup

Leinster Senior Cup

Fourth Round

UEFA Europa Conference League

First qualifying round

Footnotes

References

Dundalk F.C. seasons
Dundalk